Chief Constance Afiong "Afi" Ekong, Lady Attah (26 June 1930 – 24 February 2009) was a Nigerian artist and arts promoter.

Early life
Afi Ekong was born to Efik and Ibibio parents in Calabar, Nigeria, as a member of the royal family of Edidem Bassey Eyo Epharaim Adam III. She attended Duke Town School and Christ Church School in Calabar. She trained as a painter and studied fashion design in England, at the Oxford College of Arts and Technology, Saint Martin's School of Art and the Central School of Art and Design.

Career
Ekong began her art studies in London in 1951 at the Oxford College of Arts and Technology, she later went on to Saint Martin's School of Art in 1955, then returned to Lagos in 1957. In 1958 at the Exhibition Centre Marina, Ekong was the first woman artist to hold a solo exhibition in Lagos. In 1961 she had a solo exhibition at Galeria Galatea in Buenos Aires. She owned and operated the Bronze Gallery in various locations, in Lagos and on the Fiekong Estate in Calabar. She was manager of the Lagos Arts Council, a founding member of the Society of Nigerian Artists, also the supervisor of Gallery Labac from 1961, and chair of the Federal Arts Council Nigeria from 1961 to 1967.  She appeared regularly on a Nigerian television program called Cultural Heritage, to promote the arts. In 1963 she was featured in a New York Times photo essay as an example of the "new African woman" after independence. She also chaired a UNESCO commission in the 1970s, and in 1990 the National Council of Women's Societies Committee on Arts and Crafts.

Ekong's work to advance the arts and women's education in West Africa was recognized in 1962 when she was proclaimed "The Star of Dame Official of the Human Order of African Redemption," by President William Tubman of Liberia. She was also an ordained elder in the Presbyterian Church.

Personal life
Afi Ekong was married to government official Prince Abdul Azizi Attah, son of the Atta of Igbirra, in 1949. She died in 2009, in Calabar, at the age of 78. The Bronze Gallery remains in operation in Calabar. Paintings by Afi Ekong are in the University of Lagos Library.

References

1930 births
2009 deaths
Nigerian women artists
People from Calabar
20th-century Nigerian artists
Artists from Lagos
People of Efik descent
Nigerian royalty
Alumni of the Central School of Art and Design
Alumni of Oxford Brookes University
20th-century Nigerian women
20th-century women artists
Nigerian Presbyterians